Wasla Bangial  is a village in Union council Kuri Dolal near Mandrah in Gujar Khan, Rawalpindi, Punjab, Pakistan.

Locality 
Wasla Bangial village is located 12 km eastern side of historic Grand Trank Road crossing center of Mandrah town and located on Kalar Syedan Gujar Khan Road passing through Union council Darkali Mehmoori and village Daryal.

Sub localities 
Two sub localities of the village Wasla Bangial are:
 Chappar
 Dhoke Ghora

Tribes 
major tribes in Village Wasla Bangial,
 Bangial Rajputs (Panwar Rajputs)
 Meiyal Rajputs
 Alvi(qazi)

References 
Bangial

Villages in Pakistan
Punjab
Rawalpindi District
Gujar Khan